Thomas Conway (born 7 November 1933) was an English footballer who played as an inside-forward for Port Vale and Leek Town in the 1950s.

Career
Conway graduated through the Port Vale juniors to sign professional forms in May 1951. After making his debut in a 1–0 defeat to Rotherham United at Millmoor on 27 August 1955 he became a regular in the side. He scored his first goal in the Football League on 3 September, in a 3–0 win over Swansea Town at Vale Park, and later claimed goals against Fulham and Nottingham Forest before he lost his first team place in December that year. He scored four goals in 15 Second Division appearances in the 1955–56 season, before he was transferred to non-league Leek Town in the summer of 1956.

Career statistics
Source:

References

1933 births
Footballers from Stoke-on-Trent
English footballers
Association football forwards
Port Vale F.C. players
Leek Town F.C. players
English Football League players
Living people